Nic Scheitler (18 May 1910 – 18 September 1999) was a Luxembourgian weightlifter. He competed at the 1928 Summer Olympics and the 1936 Summer Olympics.

References

1910 births
1999 deaths
Luxembourgian male weightlifters
Olympic weightlifters of Luxembourg
Weightlifters at the 1928 Summer Olympics
Weightlifters at the 1936 Summer Olympics
People from Differdange